Malloderma is a genus of longhorn beetles of the subfamily Lamiinae, containing the following species:

 Malloderma kuegleri Holzschuh, 2010
 Malloderma pascoei Lacordaire, 1872
 Malloderma pulchra (Pic, 1926)

References

Saperdini